, also known as , (born Osaka, 3 May 1975) is a Japanese former rugby union player. He played as wing and as fullback. He is not related to the late Seiji Hirao. As of 2015 he works as teacher at Kobe Shinwa Women's University's Development and Education Faculty of Junior sports education Department, with "sports pedagogy", "kinematics" as field of specialization and "body and sports" and "sports education rooted in children's development" as research field.

Career
Hirao started to play rugby since his first year at the secondary school days. He left the basketball club and joined the rugby club when the club members eagerly invited him to join them. He then accepted. 
Hirao attended Doshisha Junior High School and Doshisha University, earning a master in commerce in the latter.
He played for Mitsubishi Motors Kyoto and then, for Kobelco Steelers between 1999 and 2006.  With Kobe Steel, Hirao won three Japan Championships in 2000, 2001 and 2004 and two All Japan Championship titles in 2000 and 2001.
Hirao debuted for Japan in 1998, against South Korea in Bangkok, on 18 December. He was also part of the 1999 Rugby World Cup squad, playing only the match against Wales. His last cap was against Italy, in Tokyo, on 4 July 2004.
As of March 2007, Hirao retired from playing due to the continuous concussions he had during play, resulting in diplopia and distortion of visibility.
As of March 2008, he also was manager and coach of the Kobe club SCIX Rugby Club and  completed a master's degree in pedagogy and graduated in letters in Kobe Shinwa Women's University.

Books
 "Aikidō to ragubī o tsuranuku mono - jisedai no karada-ron" (Those who pass through Aikido and Rugby - next generation body theory（13/9/2007, Asahi Shinsho 64）  - （co-author, along with Taro Uchida）
 "Chikakute tōi kono karada" (Near and far this body)（27/9/2014、Mishima-sha）  
 "Boku-ra no karada shugyō-ron" (Our theory of physical exercise)（9/3/2015, Asahi Shinsho）   - （co-author, along with Taro Uchida）

Notes

External links
Takafumi Hirao international stats
Tsuyoshi Hirao international stats

1975 births
Japanese rugby union players
Japanese rugby union coaches
Rugby union fullbacks
Rugby union wings
Kobelco Kobe Steelers players
Japan international rugby union players
Living people
Asian Games medalists in rugby union
Rugby union players at the 1998 Asian Games
Asian Games silver medalists for Japan
Medalists at the 1998 Asian Games